Polyhydroxybutyrate (PHB) is a polyhydroxyalkanoate (PHA), a polymer belonging to the polyesters class that are of interest as bio-derived and biodegradable plastics. The poly-3-hydroxybutyrate (P3HB) form of PHB is probably the most common type of polyhydroxyalkanoate, but other polymers of this class are produced by a variety of organisms: these include poly-4-hydroxybutyrate (P4HB), polyhydroxyvalerate (PHV), polyhydroxyhexanoate (PHH), polyhydroxyoctanoate (PHO) and their copolymers.

Biosynthesis
PHB is produced by microorganisms (such as Cupriavidus necator, Methylobacterium rhodesianum or Bacillus megaterium) apparently in response to conditions of physiological stress; mainly conditions in which nutrients are limited. The polymer is primarily a product of carbon assimilation (from glucose or starch) and is employed by microorganisms as a form of energy storage molecule to be metabolized when other common energy sources are not available. 

Microbial biosynthesis of PHB starts with the condensation of two molecules of acetyl-CoA to give acetoacetyl-CoA which is subsequently reduced to hydroxybutyryl-CoA. This latter compound is then used as a monomer to polymerize PHB. PHAs granules are then recovered by disrupting the cells.

Thermoplastic polymer
Most commercial plastics are synthetic polymers derived from petrochemicals.  They tend to resist biodegradation.  PHB-derived plastics are attractive because they are compostable and derived from renewables and are bio-degradable.

ICI had developed the material to pilot plant stage in the 1980s, but interest faded when it became clear that the cost of material was too high, and its properties could not match those of polypropylene. Some bottles were made for Wella's "Sanara" range of shampoo; an example using the tradename "Biopol" is in the collection of the Science Museum, London.

In 1996 Monsanto (who sold PHB as a copolymer with PHV) bought all patents for making the polymer from ICI/Zeneca including the trademark "Biopol". However, Monsanto's rights to Biopol were sold to the American company Metabolix in 2001 and Monsanto's fermenters producing PHB from bacteria were closed down at the start of 2004. Monsanto began to focus on producing PHB from plants instead of bacteria. But now with so much media attention on GM crops, there has been little news of Monsanto's plans for PHB.

Biopol is currently used in the medical industry for internal suture. It is nontoxic and biodegradable, so it does not have to be removed after recovery.

TephaFLEX is a bacterially derived poly-4-hydroxybutyrate, manufactured using a recombinant fermentation process by Tepha Medical Devices, intended for a variety of medical applications that require biodegradable materials such as absorbable sutures.

Properties
Water-insoluble and relatively resistant to hydrolytic degradation. This differentiates PHB from most other currently available biodegradable plastics, which are either water-soluble or moisture-sensitive.
Good oxygen permeability.
Good ultra-violet resistance but poor resistance to acids and bases.
Soluble in chloroform and other chlorinated hydrocarbons.
Biocompatible and hence is suitable for medical applications.
Melting point 175 °C., and glass transition temperature 2 °C.
Tensile strength 40 MPa, close to that of polypropylene.
Sinks in water (while polypropylene floats), facilitating its anaerobic biodegradation in sediments.
Nontoxic.
Less 'sticky' when melted.

History
Polyhydroxybutyrate was first isolated and characterized in 1925 by French microbiologist Maurice Lemoigne.

Biodegradation

Firmicutes and proteobacteria can degrade PHB. Bacillus, Pseudomonas and Streptomyces species can degrade PHB. Pseudomonas lemoigne, Comamonas sp. Acidovorax faecalis, Aspergillus fumigatus and Variovorax paradoxus are soil microbes capable of degradation. Alcaligenes faecalis, Pseudomonas, and Illyobacter delafieldi, are obtained from anaerobic sludge. Comamonas testosteroni and Pseudomonas stutzeri were obtained from sea water. Few of these are capable of degrading at higher temperatures; notably excepting thermophilic Streptomyces sp. and a thermophilic strain of Aspergillus sp.

References

External links
 Abstract of award for PHAs

Polyesters
Biodegradable plastics
Thermoplastics
Bioplastics